The United States Army Quartermaster Corps, formerly the Quartermaster Department, is a sustainment and former combat service support (CSS) branch of the United States Army. It is also one of three U.S. Army logistics branches, the others being the Transportation Corps and the Ordnance Corps.

The U.S. Army Quartermaster Corps mission is to support the development, production, acquisition, and sustainment of general supply, Mortuary Affairs, subsistence, petroleum and water, and material and distribution management during peace and war to provide combat power to the U.S. Army. The officer in charge of the branch for doctrine, training, and professional development purposes is the Quartermaster General. The current Quartermaster General is Brigadier General Michael B. Siegl.

History

The Quartermaster Corps is the U.S. Army's oldest logistics branch, established 16 June 1775. On that date, the Second Continental Congress passed a resolution providing for "one Quartermaster General of the grand army and a deputy, under him, for the separate army".  

In 1802 under President Thomas Jefferson the size of the US Army was reduced with the Quartermaster Department being disbanded.  In its place the nation was divided into three departments, each with its own agent and subordinates who were responsible for quartermaster functions within each Department  The Quartermaster Corps was re-established in 1812.

From 1775 to 1912, this organization was known as the Quartermaster Department. In 1912, Congress consolidated the former Subsistence, Pay, and Quartermaster Departments to create the Quartermaster Corps. Quartermaster units and soldiers have served in every U.S. military operation from the Revolutionary War to recent operations in Iraq (Operation Iraqi Freedom) and Afghanistan (Operation Enduring Freedom).

Insignia
The Regimental Insignia was authorized in 1986 and revised in 1994 to the current insignia. The insignia is described as a gold color metal and enamel device 1 inch in height consisting of a gold eagle with wings spread and head lowered looking to his right and standing upon a wheel with a blue felloe set with thirteen gold stars, having thirteen gold spokes and the hub white with a red center; superimposed on the wheel a gold sword and key crossed diagonally hilt and bow up, all on a black background and resting upon a wreath of green laurel terminating at either side below the eagle's wings at the upper end of the sword and key. Attached below the device is a gold scroll inscribed SUPPORTING VICTORY in black. The original regimental insignia was all gold and approved on 31 March 1986. The design was changed on 7 June 1994 to add color to the insignia. The Regimental DUI is worn on the Soldier's right side above the name tag and any unit awards on the Army Service Uniform.
The Branch Insignia was approved in its present form in 1913.  The sword is characteristic of military forces and symbolized the Quartermaster Corps control of military supplies. The key is representative of the Corps traditional storekeeping function. The wheel is styled after a six-mule-wagon wheel and represents transportation and delivery of supplies. The wheel has thirteen spokes, a red and white hub, and a blue felloe (the outer edge of the wheel) embedded with thirteen gilt (gold) stars. The thirteen stars and spokes of the wheel represent the original colonies and the origin of the Corps which occurred during the Revolutionary War. The gilt (gold) eagle is the national bird and is symbolic of our nation. The colors red, white, and blue are the national colors. The Branch Insignia is worn on the lapel of the Army Service Uniform, singly on a brass disk for Enlisted personnel and in pairs for Officers.

Functions
The function of the Quartermaster Corps is to provide the following support to the Army:

general supply (except for ammunition and medical supplies)
Mortuary Affairs (formerly graves registration)
subsistence (food service)
petroleum and water
field services
aerial delivery (parachute packing, air item maintenance, heavy and light equipment parachute drop, rigging and sling loading)
shower, laundry, fabric/light textile repair
material and distribution management

Former functions
Former functions and missions of the Quartermaster Corps were:

military transportation (given to the newly established Army Transport Service during the American Civil War  and to the Transportation Corps in 1942)
military construction (given to the Corps of Engineers in the early 1940s) 
U.S. Army Remount Service horses/war dogs (military dog training given to Corps of Military Police in 1951) 
military heraldry (given to the Adjutant General's Corps in 1962)

Units
Quartermaster detachments, companies and battalions are normally assigned to corps or higher level commands. Divisions and smaller units have multifunctional support battalions which combine functional areas from the Army Transportation Corps, Army Quartermaster Corps, Army Ordnance Corps, and the Army Medical Service Corps.

Quartermaster organizations include field service, general supply, petroleum supply and petroleum pipeline, aerial delivery (rigger), water, and mortuary affairs units. Most are company level except petroleum and water, which has battalion and group level units.
There is one Bulk petroleum Company on Active Duty.

Military Occupational Specialities
The nine Quartermaster Enlisted Military Occupational Specialties (MOSs) are:

92A – Automated Logistical Specialist
92F – Petroleum Supply Specialist
92G – Culinary Specialist
92L – Petroleum Laboratory Specialist
92M – Mortuary Affairs Specialist
92R – Parachute Rigger
92S – Shower/Laundry and Clothing Repair Specialist
92W – Water Treatment Specialist
92Y – Unit Supply Specialist

The five Quartermaster Warrant Officer Military Occupational Specialties (MOSs) are:

920A – Property Accounting Technician
920B – Supply Systems Technician
921A – Airdrop Systems Technician
922A – Food Service Technician
923A – Petroleum Systems Technician

The three Quartermaster Officer Areas of Concentration (AOCs) have been merged into 92A as Additional Skill Identifiers (ASIs)

92A – Quartermaster, General
R9 – Aerial Delivery and Materiel (formerly 92D)
R8 – Petroleum and Water (formerly 92F)

Leadership / School
The officer in charge of the branch for doctrine, training, and professional development purposes is the Quartermaster General. The current Quartermaster General is Brigadier General Michelle Donahue. The Quartermaster General does not have command authority over Quartermaster units, but instead commands the United States Army Quartermaster Center and School, located at Fort Lee, Virginia, near Petersburg. This school provides enlisted advanced individual training (AIT) and leader training for Quartermaster officers, warrant officers and non-commissioned officers.

For a list of US Army Quartermasters General, see Quartermaster General (United States).

Notable casualties
The 14th Quartermaster Detachment, a U.S. Army Reserve unit from Greensburg, Pennsylvania, suffered the greatest number of casualties of any allied unit in the Gulf War from a Scud missile attack on 25 February 1991
Maj. Steve V. Long, a Quartermaster Officer who was serving as Secretary of the General Staff Office of the Commanding General U.S. Total Army Personnel Command, was one of the casualties of the September 11 attacks when American Airlines Flight 77 struck the Pentagon.
Several members of the 507th Maintenance Company were captured or killed in an ambush on 23 March 2003 during the Iraq War:
Sergeant Donald Walters, killed in action – Silver Star recipient
Specialist Edgar Hernandez, captured
Specialist Shoshana Johnson, captured
Private First Class Howard Johnson II, killed in action
Private First Class Jessica Lynch, captured
Private First Class Lori Piestewa, killed in action
Private Brandon Sloan, killed in action
Private Ruben Estrella-Soto, Jr, killed in action

Quartermaster Creed

Military Order of Saint Martin
The Quartermaster Corps established this private order on 7 February 1997. The emblematic figure is of Saint Martin of Tours. The medal, for Quartermasters either on Active Duty, in the Reserves, or Civilian status, is awarded in three grades: 
Ancient Order of Saint Martin (gold medallion)
Distinguished Order of Saint Martin (silver medallion)
Honorable Order of Saint Martin (bronze medallion)
An updated list of recipients is maintained on the Association of Quartermasters website.

The Military Order of Saint Martin is awarded by the Association of Quartermasters and not the United States Army.

Quartermaster Unit Insignia

See also
Military supply
Quartermaster
Quartermaster Center and School
Quartermaster Corps
Quartermaster general
Army Quartermaster Museum

Notes

Further reading
Early History of the Quartermaster Corps

Korean War

External links
Official web site

Branches of the United States Army
Quartermasters